The 2017 VTV Awards (Vietnamese: Ấn tượng VTV - Điểm hẹn 2017) is a ceremony honouring the outstanding achievement in television on the Vietnam Television (VTV) network from August 2016 to July 2017. It took place on September 7, 2017 in Hanoi and hosted by Lại Văn Sâm & Thanh Vân Hugo.

Winners and nominees
(Winners denoted in bold)

Presenters/Awarders 
Several winners was announced by the hosts Lại Văn Sâm & Thanh Vân Hugo, then the awarder only appeared to give the prize.

Special performances

References

External links

2017 television awards
VTV Awards
2017 in Vietnamese television
September 2017 events in Vietnam